Bárbara Alejandra Muñoz Bustamante (born 2 January 1992) is a Chilean footballer who plays as a defender for Santiago Morning and the Chile women's national team.

International career
Muñoz played for the senior team of Chile at the 2014 South American Games and the 2014 Copa América Femenina.

References

External links

1992 births
Living people
Women's association football defenders
Chilean women's footballers
Chile women's international footballers
South American Games silver medalists for Chile
South American Games medalists in football
Competitors at the 2014 South American Games
Audax Italiano footballers
Colo-Colo (women) footballers
Santiago Morning (women) footballers
20th-century Chilean women
21st-century Chilean women